Maúa District is a district of Niassa Province in north-western Mozambique. The principal town is Maúa.

 Area: 7,976 km2.
 Population (est. 2005): 52,852

Further reading
District profile (PDF)

Districts in Niassa Province